Paula Jane Radcliffe MBE (born 17 December 1973) is a former British long-distance runner. She is a three-time winner of the London Marathon (2002, 2003, 2005), three-time New York Marathon champion (2004, 2007, 2008), and 2002 Chicago Marathon winner. She was previously the fastest female marathoner of all time, and held the Women's World Marathon Record with a time of 2:15:25 for 16 years from 2003 to 2019 when it was broken by Brigid Kosgei.

Radcliffe is a former world champion in the marathon, half marathon and cross country. She has also been European champion over 10,000 metres and in cross country. On the track, Radcliffe won the 10,000 metres silver medal at the 1999 World Championships and was the 2002 Commonwealth champion at 5000 metres. She represented Great Britain at the Olympics in four consecutive games (1996 to 2008), although she never won an Olympic medal.

Her running has earned her a number of accolades including the BBC Sports Personality of the Year, Laureus World Comeback of the Year, IAAF World Athlete of the Year, AIMS World Athlete of the Year (three times) and a Member of the Order of the British Empire (MBE). She has also been nominated for World Sportswoman of the year on several occasions. In 2010, she was inducted into the England Athletics Hall of Fame. She was inducted into the Loughborough University Hall of Fame in 2015.

She ended her competitive running career at the 2015 London Marathon.

Early life
Radcliffe was born on 17 December 1973 in Davenham near Northwich, Cheshire. Her family then moved to nearby Barnton where she attended Little Leigh Primary School. Despite suffering from asthma and anaemia, she took up running at the age of seven, influenced by her father who was a keen amateur marathon runner and joined Frodsham Athletic Club. Her family later moved to Kingsley.

When Radcliffe was aged 12, the family moved to Oakley, Bedfordshire and she became a member of Bedford & County Athletics Club. Her joining the club coincided with a talented and dedicated coach, Alex Stanton, building the women's and girls' sections into one of the strongest in the country, in spite of Bedford's relatively small size.

Radcliffe's father became club vice-chairman and her mother, a fun-runner, managed the women's cross-country team. Her first race at a national level came as a 12-year-old in 1986 when she placed 299th out of around 600 in the girls' race of the English Schools Cross Country Championships. She finished fourth in the same race one year later.

Radcliffe attended Sharnbrook Upper School and Community College. She went on to study French, German and economics at Loughborough University, gaining a first-class honours degree in Modern European Studies.

Running career
Radcliffe's father was a keen marathon runner as a young man. He took up the hobby again in an attempt to lose weight after giving up smoking. Despite suffering from asthma Radcliffe took up running at the age of seven. In 1992 Radcliffe discovered that she suffers from anaemia. Radcliffe was diagnosed with exercise induced asthma at the age of 14 after blacking out whilst training. During her father's training jogs in the woods Radcliffe and her brother would often run with him for a mile or two. Radcliffe attended Frodsham Athletic Club until the age of nine, Radcliffe became a member of Bedford & County Athletics Club, when they moved to Oakley. There she was coached by Alex Stanton, who still fulfilled that role in her professional career. Stanton started to coach Radcliffe at the age of 12 after his wife Rosemary spotted her talent. At the age of 10 Radcliffe, accompanied by her father, watched Ingrid Kristiansen run in the London Marathon, inspiring her to become an athlete. Her first race at a national level came as a 12-year-old in 1986, when she placed 299th in the English Schools Cross Country Championships. In 1991 Radcliffe won the English Schools 1500 metres title.

1992–1996
 At the 1992 IAAF World Cross Country Championships, Radcliffe, took the Junior title, beating Wang Junxia and Gete Wami in Boston, after recovering from a bad asthma attack in the weeks beforehand. Radcliffe then went to the Junior track World championships and finished fourth in the 3,000 metres. In her first senior race, in Durham at the start of 1993, Radcliffe finished second to Olympic Champion Derartu Tulu. At the age of 19 Radcliffe finished in seventh place at the 1993 World Championships. Radcliffe claimed back to back World Cross Challenge wins at Durham and Mallusk to start the 1994 season. Radcliffe missed the World Cross Country Championships with a foot injury. Radcliffe was initially misdiagnosed with the injury which forced her to miss all of 1994 and thought about quitting as the injury would not get better. At the Fanny Blankers-Koen Games in Hengelo in 1995 Radcliffe outkicked Tulu to run the third fastest time by a British woman for the 5,000 metres. At the World championships, Radcliffe qualified comfortably for the final of the 5,000 metres, where she finished fifth. At the 1996 Securicor Games Radcliffe ran the 5,000 metres finishing second. The Olympic Games saw Radcliffe finish fifth in the 5,000 metres. Radcliffe rounded off 1996 by finishing third in a cross country race in Durham.

1997–2000
1997 saw Radcliffe split Wami and Tulu, and win the silver medal at the 1997 IAAF World Cross Country Championships. Radcliffe became the first woman to defend the Fifth Avenue Mile title. In the 1997 World Championships, Radcliffe finished in 4th place over the 5,000 metres. Wami again outsprinted Radcliffe in her final race of 1997, in the Brussels cross country event. Radcliffe had dropped out of Durham's cross country race with flu at the start of 1998, but bounced back to finish third in Dublin. At the 1998 edition of the World Cross Country, Radcliffe again won the silver medal. At the European Cup Radcliffe, captaining the team, won the 5,000 metres and finished second in the 1500 metres. Radcliffe set the pace in the 10,000 metres at the European Championships, but finished fifth. Radcliffe, who was suffering from a virus, took some time off, before returning to the cross country discipline, where she won her first senior title by taking the European Long course race. 1998 finished with a fourth-place finish in Brussels.

Radcliffe started 1999 by finishing fourth in Durham. At the World Cross Country championships, Radcliffe finished with the bronze medal. Radcliffe then ran the seventh fastest 10,000 metres ever at the European 10,000 metres challenge. At the London Grand Prix, Radcliffe took two seconds off her own British record in the 5,000 metres. Radcliffe took the silver at the World Championships behind finishing behind Wami in the 10,000 metres. Radcliffe and Loruope found themselves at the front and tried to get rid of Wami but failed as the Ethiopian took the title. At the Berlin Golden league meeting, Radcliffe finished eighth in the 5,000 metres. Radcliffe then ran the second fastest half marathon by a British woman, finishing third on her debut at the distance at the Great North Run, despite getting into a tangle with a spectator.

Starting 2000, Radcliffe won the Stormont Cross Country race for a third time. Radcliffe then finished fourth in Durham. Radcliffe then sustained a knee injury. For the European Cup, Radcliffe joined a host of other British athletes by pulled out injured. However, Radcliffe soon returned to the track for the first time since March after a virus, a knee operation and a calf muscle tear had kept her out; to race over 1,500 metres in Barcelona. In her first race since the World Cross Country, Radcliffe finished 11th. At the London Grand Prix, Radcliffe finished second, one second outside of her British record, in only her second track race of the season. At the Weltklasse Zürich IAAF Golden League meeting Radcliffe competed in the 3,000 metres and finished in fourth place. At the UK trials won the 5,000 metres title. The British Grand Prix saw Radcliffe race over 3000 metres, where once again she finished third. At the 2000 Olympic Games in Sydney, Radcliffe finished sixth in her 10,000 metres heat to qualify for the final. In the final Radcliffe set a new British record, but crossed the line in fourth and was highly disappointed to miss out on a medal. Radcliffe returned to action by winning the BUPA Ireland five-mile race. At the Great North Run, Radcliffe ran a new European record for the half marathon, as she won the race in a time of 67 minutes and 7 seconds. Radcliffe was then selected for the 2000 IAAF World Half Marathon Championships in Mexico. Radcliffe won her first World title, despite suffering a panic attack when her nose tape, designed to help her breathe, fell off halfway round. The good run of form came to an end, when she turned her attention to the Cross Country events and finished third in Brussels. Radcliffe confirmed that her last race of the year would be the Great North Cross Country. There Radcliffe defeated Tulu by seventy-five seconds, in eight inches of snow.

She won back-to-back titles in the 2000 and 2001 IAAF World Half Marathon Championships, winning a third title in 2003.

Cross country champion
On 24 March, Radcliffe won the Ostend, Belgium-held World Cross Country Championships 2001 title in a time of 27:49.

Held in March in Dublin, Radcliffe defended her title in the Women's Long Race when she won the 2002 IAAF World Cross Country Championships title for a second year. She won in 26:46.

Marathon world record
In 2002, Radcliffe made the move up to the marathon, a decision that immediately paid off with victory at her debut in that year's London Marathon on 14 April 2002 in a world's best time for a women's only race (2:18:55). Her time was the second quickest in women's marathon history behind the world record of 2:18:47 set by Catherine Ndereba, of Kenya, in Chicago.

Later that year, Radcliffe set a world record time of 2:17:18 in the Chicago Marathon on 13 October 2002, breaking the previous record by a minute and a half.

She was awarded an MBE in June 2002. She said: "It means a great deal to me, it's a great honour and it really tops off an amazing year. To come here and receive this and to meet the Queen at the end of it just finishes it off perfectly."

Later the same year, she became the BBC Sports Personality of the Year, making her the first woman in over a decade to be honoured with the accolade. Paula thanked her husband Gary Lough, her coach Alex Stanton and her physio, Gerard Hartmann.

Further world records
Radcliffe set her last women's marathon world record during the 2003 London Marathon in April, with a time of 2:15:25. The performance is one of the highest of score's values in terms of the IAAF World ranking points.

Radcliffe is the former world record holder for the women's road 10k in a time of 30 minutes and 21 seconds, which she set on 23 February 2003 in the World's Best 10K in San Juan, Puerto Rico.

Radcliffe won the 2004 New York City Marathon in a time of 2:23:10, beating Kenya's Susan Chepkemei.

2004 Athens Olympics
Radcliffe did not compete in the London Marathon in 2004, but was the favourite to win a gold medal in the marathon at the Olympic Games in Athens. However, she suffered an injury to her leg just two weeks prior to the event and had to use a high dose of anti-inflammatory drugs. This had an adverse effect on her stomach, hindering food absorption. She ended up withdrawing from the race after . Five days later she started in the 10,000 metres but, still suffering from the effects of the marathon, retired with eight laps remaining. Radcliffe said "You go through bad stages in a marathon, but never as bad as that", "I've never before not been able to finish and I'm desperately trying to find a reason for what happened", "I just feel numb – this is something I worked so hard for."

Regarded as Great Britain's best gold medal hope in athletics, her withdrawal made headlines in the UK, with editorial stances ranging from support to negativity, with some newspapers deriding Radcliffe for 'quitting', rather than going on to finish the race. Television pictures showed Radcliffe in a clearly distressed state after dropping out of the marathon, being comforted by two friends from her early running days.

2005: Marathon World Champion

At the 2005 London Marathon, Radcliffe won with a time of 2:17:42, a world's best time for a women's only race by over a minute. The race is remembered for a notorious moment towards the end when Radcliffe, hindered by runner's diarrhea and in need for a toilet break, stopped and defecated on the side of the road in view of the crowd and TV cameras which broadcast the incident live. After the race, she apologised to viewers and explained what happened, "I was losing time because I was having stomach cramps and I thought 'I just need to go and I'll be fine'. ... I didn't really want to resort to that in front of hundreds of thousands of people. Basically I needed to go. I must have eaten too much beforehand". In November 2006, the incident was voted top running moment in history in the UK from a choice of ten "unforgettable moments".

On 14 August 2005 at the World Championships held in Helsinki she won Britain's only gold medal when she took the marathon title, dominating the race and setting a championship record time of 2:20:57. Catherine Ndereba of Kenya finished in second place, more than a minute behind. Radcliffe said: "It pretty much went according to plan. If somebody had been with me at the end I think I could have pushed it up a bit more." She and three other British runners were also awarded third place in the team competition.

Family and autobiography

Radcliffe took a break through the 2006 season owing to injuries and in July announced that she was expecting her first child. Her comeback was further delayed in 2007 as a result of a stress fracture in her lower back.

Radcliffe chose not to defend her world marathon crown in 2007, in order to undertake further rehabilitation, but insisted she wanted to compete in the next two Olympics. She made her return to competitive running on 30 September 2007, taking part in the BUPA Great North Run in the UK on Tyneside. This was her first race in almost two years. Radcliffe finished second behind US runner Kara Goucher.

Radcliffe made her marathon return at the New York City Marathon on 4 November 2007 which she won with an official time of 2:23:09.

Radcliffe released an autobiography in 2004, Paula: My Story So Far.

2008–09: Beijing Olympics and fitness problems

Radcliffe withdrew from the 2008 London Marathon due to a foot injury. Shortly after the London Marathon, it was also revealed that Radcliffe was suffering from an injury to her hip, preventing her from running. Originally thought to be a muscular problem, scans later revealed it was a stress fracture to her femur. Radcliffe won the 2008 Great South Run in 51 minutes 11 seconds, 11 seconds off of Sonia O' Sullivan's course record. In May, Radcliffe broke her left leg.

Radcliffe managed to get to fitness level for the 2008 Summer Olympics, but cramped during the marathon to the point where she had to stop running and stretch. She resumed the race and finished in 23rd place overall.

Radcliffe won the 2008 New York City Marathon, making it her third victory at the competition with a time of 2:23:56. Russian Lyudmila Petrova came in second, and American Kara Goucher took third.

Following the New York Marathon, Radcliffe suffered more injury setbacks: she had to withdraw from the 2009 London Marathon due to a fractured toe. In March that year, she had a bunion removed which doctors believed was the root cause of her other injuries at that time. She did not run competitively for almost 10 months, but made herself available for inclusion in the 2009 British team for the World Championships in Athletics. She announced that the New York City Half Marathon would be a testing ground for her fitness before the competition.

Radcliffe went on to win the New York City Half Marathon in 1:09:45, two seconds off the course record. However, after this she pulled out of the World Championships as she felt unfit, and she missed the 2009 IAAF World Half Marathon Championships in Birmingham due to a bout of tonsillitis. She returned to action at the 2009 New York City Marathon but failed to notch her third consecutive victory, instead fading to fourth place with knee problems.

2011 onwards

Following a 19-month layoff that included the birth of her second child, she returned to action at the Bupa London , where she finished 3rd, 55 seconds behind the winner, Jo Pavey.  Radcliffe called the performance "a bit of a disaster", and indicated she was suffering from a tear in one of the discs of her back.

She set the 2011 Berlin Marathon as her comeback venue to try for an Olympic qualifying time. She came third in the race with a time of 2:23:46 hours – getting the Olympic standard and the fourth fastest time by a European that year. She was dissatisfied, however, saying: "I'm not particularly happy, either with my time or my place. I came here wanting to win". She used the 2012 Vienna Half Marathon to gauge her fitness and the race was set up as a battle between her and Haile Gebrselassie, with Radcliffe receiving a head start of 7:52 minutes (the difference between the two athletes' personal bests). She did not perform well and was comfortably beaten by the Ethiopian, while she crossed the line after 72:03 minutes.

Radcliffe pulled out of London 2012 Olympics because of a foot injury.

In January 2015, Radcliffe announced that she had decided to end her marathon career on 26 April 2015 by competing in the 2015 London Marathon. She finished in 2:36:55.

Other achievements and awards
Awarded the BBC London Sports Awards 2003 for 'Sporting Moment of the Year'.
Radcliffe has set numerous records, official and unofficial, on the track and the roads. She has twice won the World Half-Marathon championships, twice the World Cross-Country championships (in 2001 and 2002), and in December 2003 became European Cross-Country champion for the second time, the only woman to have achieved this feat in the event's ten-year history.
 In 2004 Radcliffe joined with Jonathan Edwards on an Olympic Special Who Wants to Be a Millionaire?. The pair raised £64,000 for charity, half of that sum going to the British Olympic Association and a quarter of the sum going to Asthma UK.
 Nominated for the Sports Personality Award in 2007.
 Won the Laureus World Comeback of the Year award in early 2008 for her performances in 2007.
 Radcliffe won the Londoner of the Year award at the 2016 London Press Club awards despite being from Bedford.

Anti-doping activity
Radcliffe has frequently made high-profile condemnations of the use of performance-enhancing drugs in athletics. Radcliffe and teammate Hayley Tullett caused controversy when, in the heats of the 5,000 metres at the 2001 World Athletics Championships in Edmonton, they held up a sign protesting against the reinstatement of Russian athlete Olga Yegorova after Yegorova had tested positive for the banned substance EPO. The sign was made by Radcliffe's husband and read 'EPO Cheats Out'. It was eventually taken off them by the stadium officials, but not before it was streamed around the world. After Radcliffe and Tullett's initial protest, teammates Kathy Butler and Hayley Yelling – who both missed out on a place in the final – protested alongside coaches Mark Rowland and Alan Storey, wearing Radcliffe masks and holding up banners with mocking slogans including one which read 'Free Paula'. Radcliffe vowed to continue her fight against drugs in sport after her high-profile actions in Edmonton. Since the 1999 European Cup, Radcliffe wears a red ribbon when competing to show her support for blood testing as a method of catching drug cheats.

Radcliffe has advocated a system where first time offenders are banned for four years and any future offence for life. However, she felt that in cases like that of Christine Ohuruogu, who missed three out-of-competition drugs tests, that she should be allowed to compete in the Olympics, as the BOA does not allow anyone who has served a doping ban to compete. However, when Ohuruogu admitted to not trying to get to the tests, Radcliffe expressed her disappointment and hoped that it was a lesson learned. When Marion Jones admitted to steroid use, Radcliffe stated that it was good for the sport that Jones was caught and that they had to keep testing and that people being caught is a big deterrent to would-be cheats.

Doping allegations
Reflecting upon the scepticism created by incidents of doping, she said "You have to accept the situation...it would be great if we could win the battle against doping and have testing that was 100 per-cent reliable, but I don't think that will happen in my competitive career." She has previously asked for the results of a blood test taken at the London Marathon to be made public, saying that she had "absolutely no objection to my test being released".

In 2015, in the wake of revelations of widespread doping in athletics, Radcliffe said that, unlike some other prominent British athletes, she would not be releasing her blood-test history, and discouraged other athletes from doing so. She was later indirectly identified as a suspected doper by MP Jesse Norman during a parliamentary inquiry into blood doping. In response, Radcliffe issued a statement in which she "categorically denied" cheating in any form and said she has "nothing to hide". Shortly afterwards, her three suspect test results were leaked, though Radcliffe still refused to release her complete blood-test history. In late November 2015, the IAAF declared that the accusations were "based on the gross misinterpretation of incomplete data". The UK Anti Doping Agency, having received Radcliffe's blood test history via the IAAF, stated that "UKAD has come to the same conclusion as the IAAF review that there is no case to answer". It is likely that the first suspicious off-score was caused by faulty equipment. The third suspicious off-score was the direct result of an altitude training trip in Kenya with Mo Farah and other British athletes.

Personal life
Radcliffe was born to Peter and Pat Radcliffe and is the grandniece of 1920 Olympic silver medallist Charlotte Radcliffe. Radcliffe met her husband Gary Lough, a former Northern Irish 1,500 m runner, when he was her lodger at Loughborough University. The pair married in 2001. She gave birth to her first child, daughter Isla, in 2007. Her second child, a son, Raphael, was born in 2010. The family resides in Monte Carlo.

Major career achievements

Championships record

Road races

Personal bests

Honours

Commonwealth honours
 Commonwealth honours

Scholastic
 University degrees

 Honorary Degrees

Freedom of the City

  28 June 2004: Charnwood.

References

Bibliography

Further reading
Paula Radcliffe 'bionic' kit, (14 August 2005)
Paula Radcliffe: One Track Mind, (16 April 2005)
Paula Radcliffe: Long Road Back, (31 October 2004)
Paula Radcliffe: Failing to finish at the 2004 Olympic Games, (22 August 2004)
Paula Radcliffe: Journey from Disappointing Fourth to Dominant First, (June 2004)
Paula Radcliffe: Escorting Paula, (April 2003)
Paula Radcliffe: A Guardian interview about drug use in sport, (20 August 2001)

External links

 
 
 
 
 SPIKES Hero profile on www.spikesmag.com
 "Paula Radcliffe", n°31 on Time's list of "100 Olympic Athletes To Watch"

1973 births
Living people
Alumni of Loughborough University
Athletes (track and field) at the 1996 Summer Olympics
Athletes (track and field) at the 2000 Summer Olympics
Athletes (track and field) at the 2004 Summer Olympics
Athletes (track and field) at the 2008 Summer Olympics
Athletes (track and field) at the 2002 Commonwealth Games
BBC Sports Personality of the Year winners
British female long-distance runners
British female marathon runners
Chicago Marathon female winners
Commonwealth Games gold medallists for England
English expatriates in Monaco
European Athletics Championships medalists
London Marathon female winners
Members of the Order of the British Empire
New York City Marathon female winners
Olympic athletes of Great Britain
People educated at Sharnbrook Academy
People from the Borough of Bedford
People from Davenham
World Athletics Championships athletes for Great Britain
World Athletics Championships medalists
World Athletics record holders
Commonwealth Games medallists in athletics
World Athletics Cross Country Championships winners
World Athletics Half Marathon Championships winners
Sportspeople from Cheshire
People from Monte Carlo
English female marathon runners
European Cross Country Championships winners
World Athletics Championships winners
Medallists at the 2002 Commonwealth Games